The following is an overview of 1925 in film, including significant events, a list of films released and notable births and deaths.

Top-grossing films (U.S.)
The top nine 1925 released films by box office gross in North America are as follows:

Events
June 26: Charlie Chaplin's The Gold Rush premieres. It is voted the best film of the year by critics in The Film Daily annual poll
September 25: Ufa-Palast am Zoo in Berlin rebuilt as Germany's largest cinema reopens.
November 5: MGM's war drama film The Big Parade is released. It is a massive commercial success, becoming the highest-grossing picture of the 1920s in the United States.
December 30: MGM's biblical epic Ben-Hur: A Tale of the Christ premieres in New York City. It is the most expensive silent film ever made, costing $4 million (around $ million when adjusted for inflation)
Hong Shen publishes the film script Mrs. Shentu in the Shanghai magazine Eastern Miscellany. It is never filmed, but is considered a milestone in film history for being the first published film script in China. Hong also directs his first film, Young Master Feng, at Mingxing (Star) Film Company in this year.

Notable films released in 1925
For the complete list of US film releases for the year, see United States films of 1925

A
Ang Pagtitipid, directed by José Nepomuceno – (Philippines)
Are Parents People?, directed by Malcolm St. Clair, starring Adolphe Menjou

B
The Battleship Potemkin (Bronyenosyets Potyomkin), directed by Sergei Eisenstein – (U.S.S.R.)
The Bells (Le Juif Polonais), directed by and starring Harry Southwell
Ben-Hur: A Tale of the Christ, directed by Fred Niblo, starring Ramón Novarro, May McAvoy and Francis X. Bushman
The Big Parade, directed by King Vidor, starring John Gilbert and Renée Adorée
The Blackguard (Die Prinzessin und der Geiger), directed by Graham Cutts – (GB/Germany)
Braveheart, directed by Alan Hale Sr., starring Rod La Rocque

C
Chess Fever (Shakhmatnaya goryachka), directed by Vsevolod Pudovkin – (U.S.S.R.)
Chronicles of the Gray House, directed by Arthur von Gerlach, starring Lil Dagover (Germany)
The Circle, directed by Frank Borzage, starring Eleanor Boardman
Cobra, directed by Joseph Henabery, starring Rudolph Valentino and Nita Naldi
Corazón Aymara (Aymara Heart) (lost), directed by Pedro Sambarino – (Bolivia)
Curses!, directed by William Goodrich (Roscoe "Fatty" Arbuckle) and Grover Jones

D
The Dark Angel, directed by George Fitzmaurice, starring Ronald Colman and Vilma Bánky
Dr. Pyckle and Mr. Pryde, directed by Scott Pembroke and Joe Rock, starring Stan Laurel
Don Q, Son of Zorro, directed by Donald Crisp, starring Douglas Fairbanks and Mary Astor

E
The Eagle, directed by Clarence Brown, starring Rudolph Valentino and Vilma Bánky

F
The Farmer from Texas (Der Farmer aus Texas), directed by Joe May, starring Lillian Hall-Davis and Willy Fritsch – (Germany)
Feu Mathias Pascal (The Late Mathias Pascal), directed by Marcel L'Herbier, starring Ivan Mosjoukine – (France)
Fifty-Fifty (lost), directed by Henri Diamant-Berger, starring Hope Hampton, Lionel Barrymore and Louise Glaum
The Freshman, directed by Fred C. Newmeyer and Sam Taylor, starring Harold Lloyd

G
Go West, starring and directed by Buster Keaton
The Gold Rush, a Charlie Chaplin film
The Goose Woman, directed by Clarence Brown, starring Louise Dresser, Jack Pickford and Constance Bennett
Grass: A Nation's Battle for Life, directed by Merian C. Cooper and Ernest B. Schoedsack
The Green Archer, a 10-chapter (three chapters exist) serial directed by Spencer Gordon Bennet, starring Allene Ray and Walter Miller, based on the 1923 novel by Edgar Wallace

H
The Haunted Honeymoon, directed by Fred Guiol and Ted Wilde, starring Glenn Tryon
The Heart Breaker, directed by Benjamin Stoloff
His People, directed by Edward Sloman, starring Rudolph Schildkraut
His Supreme Moment (lost), directed by George Fitzmaurice, starring Blanche Sweet and Ronald Colman
El Húsar de la Muerte (The Hussar of Death), starring and directed by Pedro Sienna – (Chile)

I
Isn't Life Terrible?, directed by Leo McCarey, starring Charley Chase and Oliver Hardy

J
Joyless Street (Die freudlose Gasse), directed by G. W. Pabst, starring Greta Garbo, Werner Krauss and Asta Nielsen – (Germany)

K
The King on Main Street, directed by Monta Bell, starring Adolphe Menjou and Bessie Love 
A Kiss For Cinderella, directed by Herbert Brenon, starring Esther Ralston

L
The Lady, directed by Frank Borzage, starring Norma Talmadge
Lady of the Night, directed by Monta Bell, starring Norma Shearer
Lazybones, directed by Frank Borzage, starring Madge Bellamy, Buck Jones and ZaSu Pitts
Lady Windermere's Fan, directed by Ernst Lubitsch, starring Ronald Colman and May McAvoy
Lights of Old Broadway, directed by Monta Bell, starring Marion Davies and Conrad Nagel
Little Annie Rooney, directed by William Beaudine, starring Mary Pickford and William Haines
Living Buddhas (Lebende Buddhas) (lost), directed by Paul Wegener, starring Paul Wegener and Asta Nielsen
The Lost World, directed by Harry O. Hoyt, starring Bessie Love, Lewis Stone and Wallace Beery, based on the 1912 novel by Arthur Conan Doyle
Lovers in Quarantine, directed by Frank Tuttle, starring Bebe Daniels and Harrison Ford
The Lucky Horseshoe, directed by John G. Blystone, starring Tom Mix

M
Maciste in Hell (Maciste all'inferno), directed by Guido Brignone – (Italy)
Madame Behave (lost), directed by Scott Sidney, starring Julian Eltinge and Ann Pennington
Madame Sans-Gêne (lost), directed by Léonce Perret, starring Gloria Swanson 
The Marriage of the Bear (Medvezhya Svadba), directed by Vladimir Gardin and Konstantin Eggert, based on the 1869 novella Lokis by Prosper Mérimée – (U.S.S.R.)
Master of the House (Du skal ære din hustru), directed by Carl Theodor Dreyer – (Denmark)
Men and Women (lost), directed by William C. deMille, starring Richard Dix
The Merry Widow, directed by Erich von Stroheim, starring Mae Murray and John Gilbert
Miracles of Love, directed by Vicente Salumbides, starring Dimples Cooper – (Philippines)
Les Misérables, directed by Henri Fescourt – (France)
The Monster, directed by Roland West, starring Lon Chaney and Johnny Arthur, based on the 1924 play by Crane Wilbur
The Mystic, directed by Tod Browning, starring Aileen Pringle and Conway Tearle

O
Old Clothes, directed by Edward F. Cline, starring Jackie Coogan and Joan Crawford
Orochi, directed by Buntarō Futagawa, starring Tsumasaburō Bandō – (Japan)

P
Pampered Youth (lost), directed by David Smith
The Phantom of the Moulin-Rouge (Le fantôme du Moulin-Rouge), written and directed by René Clair – (France)
The Phantom of the Opera, directed by Rupert Julian, starring Lon Chaney, Norman Kerry and Mary Philbin, based on the 1910 novel by Gaston Leroux
The Plastic Age – directed by Wesley Ruggles, starring Clara Bow and Gilbert Roland
The Pleasure Garden, directed by Alfred Hitchcock, starring Virginia Valli and Carmelita Geraghty – (GB)
Prem Sanyas (Die Leuchte Asiens | The Light of Asia), directed by Franz Osten and Himanshu Rai – (Germany/India)
Pretty Ladies, directed by Monta Bell, starring ZaSu Pitts
Proud Flesh, directed by King Vidor, starring Eleanor Boardman and Harrison Ford

R
The Rag Man, directed by Edward F. Cline, starring Jackie Coogan
The Rat, directed by Graham Cutts, starring Ivor Novello, Mae Marsh and Isabel Jeans – (GB)
The Red Head (Poil de Carotte), directed by Julien Duvivier – (France)
Red Heels (Das Spielzeug von Paris), directed by Michael Curtiz, starring Lili Damita – (Austria)
The Road to Yesterday, directed by Cecil B. DeMille, starring Joseph Schildkraut and William Boyd

S
Sally, Irene and Mary directed by Edmund Goulding, starring Constance Bennett, Joan Crawford, Sally O'Neil and William Haines
Sally of the Sawdust, directed by D. W. Griffith, starring Carol Dempster and W. C. Fields
Seven Chances, a Buster Keaton film
Seven Keys to Baldpate (lost), directed by Fred C. Newmeyer, starring Douglas MacLean, based on the 1913 novel by Earl Derr Biggers
She, directed by Leander de Cordova and G. B. Samuelson, starring Betty Blythe – (GB/Germany)
Smouldering Fires, directed by Clarence Brown, starring Pauline Frederick and Laura La Plante
Spook Ranch, directed by Edward Laemmle, starring Hoot Gibson
Stella Dallas, directed by Henry King, starring Ronald Colman, Belle Bennett and Douglas Fairbanks Jr.
The Street of Forgotten Men (lost), directed by Herbert Brenon
Strike (Stachka), directed by Sergei Eisenstein – (U.S.S.R.)
The Swan, directed by Dimitri Buchowetzki, starring Frances Howard, Adolphe Menjou and Ricardo Cortez

T
The Tailor from Torzhok (Zakroyshchik iz Torzhka), directed by Yakov Protazanov – (U.S.S.R.)
The Third Round, directed by Sidney Morgan, starring Jack Buchanan – (GB)
Three Weeks in Paris (lost), directed by Roy Del Ruth, starring Matt Moore
Too Many Kisses, directed by Paul Sloane, starring Richard Dix and William Powell
Tumbleweeds, directed by King Baggot, starring William S. Hart

U
The Unholy Three, directed by Tod Browning, starring Lon Chaney, Mae Busch, Matt Moore and Victor McLaglen, based on the 1917 novel by Tod Robbins

V
Vampires of Warsaw (Wampiry Warszawy) (lost), written and directed by Wiktor Biegański – (Poland)
Variety (Varieté), directed by Ewald André Dupont, starring Emil Jannings – (Germany)
Visages d'enfants (Faces of Children), directed by Jacques Feyder – (France)

W
The Whirlpool of Fate (La Fille de l'eau), directed by Jean Renoir – (France)
The White Lily Laments (Shirayuri wa nageku), directed by Kenji Mizoguchi – (Japan)
The Wizard of Oz, directed by Larry Semon
Wolf Blood: A Tale of the Forest, directed by George Chesebro and Bruce M. Mitchell
Womanhandled, directed by Gregory La Cava, starring Richard Dix and Esther Ralston
A Woman of the World, directed by Mal St. Clair, starring Pola Negri

Z
Zander the Great, directed by George W. Hill, starring Marion Davies and Harrison Ford

Comedy film series
Charlie Chaplin (1914–1940)
Harold Lloyd (1913–1938)
Lupino Lane (1915–1939)
Buster Keaton (1917–1944)
Laurel and Hardy (1921–1943)
Our Gang (1922–1944)
Harry Langdon (1924–1936)

Animated short film series
Felix the Cat (1919–1936)
Koko the Clown (1919–1963)
Aesop's Film Fables (1921–1934)
Alice Comedies
 Alice Cans the Cannibals
 Alice the Toreador
 Alice Gets Stung
 Alice Solves the Puzzle
 Alice's Egg Plant
 Alice Loses Out
 Alice is Stage Struck
 Alice Wins the Derby
 Alice Picks the Champ
 Alice's Tin Pony
 Alice Chops the Suey
 Alice the Jail Bird
 Alice Plays Cupid
 Alice Rattled by Rats
 Alice in the Jungle
Koko's Song Car Tunes (1924–1927)
Krazy Kat (1925–1940)
Un-Natural History (1925–1927)

Births
January 6 – Enrique Carreras, Peruvian-born director and producer (died 1995)
January 9 – Lee Van Cleef, American actor (died 1989)
January 13 – Gwen Verdon, American actress and dancer (died 2000)
January 15 - Ignacio López Tarso, Mexican actor (died 2023)
January 21 – Charles Aidman, American actor (died 1993)
January 24 – Helen Stenborg, American actress (died 2011)
January 26 
Joan Leslie, American actress (died 2015)
Paul Newman, American actor (died 2008)
February 2 – Elaine Stritch, American actress (died 2014)
February 3
Shelley Berman, American comedian, actor, and writer (died 2017)
John Fiedler, American actor and voice actor (died 2005)
February 8 – Jack Lemmon, American actor (died 2001)
February 11 – Kim Stanley, American actress (died 2001)
February 17
Ron Goodwin, English film composer (died 2003)
Hal Holbrook, American actor (died 2021)
February 18 – George Kennedy, American actor (died 2016)
February 20 – Robert Altman, American director (died 2006)
February 21 – Sam Peckinpah, American director (died 1984)
February 25 – Aino Seep, Estonian singer and actress (died 1982)
February 26 – Selma Archerd, American former actress
March 11 – Peter R. Hunt, British director, editor and producer (died 2002)
March 13 – Corrado Gaipa, Italian actor and voice actor (died 1989)
April 14 – Rod Steiger, American actor (died 2002)
April 18 – Bob Hastings, American actor (died 2014)
April 19 – Hugh O'Brian, American actor (died 2016)
April 28 – Bruce Kirby, American character actor (died 2021)
May 2 – John Neville, English-Canadian actor (died 2011)
May 25 – Jeanne Crain, American actress (died 2003)
May 26 – Alec McCowen, English actor (died 2017)
May 28 – Martha Vickers, American model, actress (died 1971)
June 3 – Tony Curtis, American actor (died 2010)
June 5 - Henny Orri, Dutch actress (died 2022)
June 7 – John Biddle, American yachting cinematographer (died 2008)
June 8 – Charles Tyner, American actor (died 2017)
June 10 - Diana Maggi, Italian-born Argentine actress (died 2022)
June 13 – Kristine Miller, American actress (died 2015)
June 16 – Otto Muehl, Austrian experimental director (died 2013)
June 20 – Audie Murphy, American soldier, actor, songwriter, rancher (died 1971)
June 21 – Maureen Stapleton, American actress (died 2006)
June 25 
June Lockhart, American actress
Virginia Patton, American actress (died 2022)
June 29
John Fujioka, American actor of Japanese descent (died 2018)
Cara Williams, American actress (died 2021)
July 1 – Farley Granger, American actor (died 2011)
July 6 – Ruth Cracknell, Australian actress (died 2002)
July 10 – Mildred Kornman, American actress (died 2022)
July 11 – David Graham (actor), English retired actor
July 13 – Huang Zongying, Chinese actress and scriptwriter (died 2020)
July 14 – Pip Freedman, South African radio comedian and actor (died 2003)
July 15 – D. A. Pennebaker, American documentary filmmaker (died 2019)
July 23 – Gloria DeHaven, American actress (died 2016)
July 24 – Miiko Taka, American actress (died 2023)
July 25 – Jerry Paris, American actor and director (died 1986)
August 6 – Barbara Bates, American singer, actress (died 1969)
August 11 – Arlene Dahl, American actress (died 2021)
August 13
Carlos Balá, Argentine actor (died 2022)
Asao Sano, Japanese actor (died 2022)
August 15 – Mike Connors, American actor (died 2017) 
August 22 – Honor Blackman, English actress (died 2020)
August 23 – Robert Mulligan, American director (died 2008)
August 27 - Susan Willis, American actress (died 2009)
August 29 - Dick Cusack, American actor and filmmaker (died 2003)
September 2 - Ronnie Stevens (actor), English character actor and voice artist (died 2006)
September 3 - Anne Jackson, American actress (died 2016)
September 8 – Peter Sellers, English comedian and actor (died 1980)
September 12
James Garbutt, British actor (died 2020)
Dickie Moore, American actor (died 2015)
September 21 – Noor Jehan, Indian actress (died 2000)
September 22 - Virginia Capers, American actress (died 2004)
September 29 - Steve Forrest, American actor (died 2013)
October 3 – Gore Vidal, American writer and actor (died 2012)
October 4 - Edmund Lyndeck, American actor (died 2015)
October 5 – Gail Davis, American actress (died 1997)
October 11 – Nancy Guild, American actress (died 1999)
October 16
Angela Lansbury, English-American actress (died 2022)
Lenka Peterson, American actress (died 2021)
October 29
Geraldine Brooks, American actress (died 1977)
Robert Hardy, English actor (died 2017)
October 31 – Lee Grant, American actress, documentarian, and director
November 4 – Doris Roberts, American actress (died 2016) 
November 6 - Michel Bouquet, French actor (died 2022)
November 10 – Richard Burton, Welsh actor (died 1984)
November 11 - Jonathan Winters, American comedian, actor, author, television host and artist (died 2013)
November 17 – Rock Hudson, American actor (died 1985)
November 20 – Mark Miller, American actor (died 2022)
November 22 - Carla Balenda, American actress
November 25 – June Whitfield, English comic actress (died 2018)
December 2 – Julie Harris, American Broadway and film actress (died 2013)
December 3 – Kaljo Kiisk, Estonian actor and director (died 2007)
December 7 – Sydney Samuelson, English cinematographer (died 2022)
December 8 – Sammy Davis Jr., American singer, dancer, musician and actor (died 1990)
December 12 – Anne V. Coates, English film editor (died 2018)
December 13 – Dick Van Dyke, American actor
December 18 – Peggy Cummins, Welsh-born Irish actress (died 2017)
December 23 – Harry Guardino, American actor (died 1995)
December 28 – Hildegard Knef, German actress, singer and writer (died 2002)

Deaths
January 24 - Wilton Taylor, American actor (born 1869)
February 4 - William Haggar, British cinema pioneer (born 1851)
February 6 - James Kenyon, English businessman and cinema pioneer (born 1850)
February 7 – Edward Jobson, American actor (born 1860)
February 25 – Louis Feuillade, French director (born 1873)
March 13 – Lucille Ricksen, American actress (born 1910)
April 8 – Thecla Åhlander, Swedish actress (born 1855)
April 13 – Frederik Buch, Danish actor (born 1875)
April 16 – David Powell, Scottish actor (born 1883)
July 29 – Mark Fenton, American actor (born 1866)
September 28 – Paul Vermoyal, French actor (born 1888)
October 21 – Orme Caldara, American stage and film actor (born 1875)
October 31 – Max Linder, French actor (born 1883)
November 1 – Lester Cuneo American actor (born 1888)
November 3 – Lucile McVey, American actress (born 1890)
December 8 – Marguerite Marsh, American actress (born 1888)
December 9 – Harry Rattenberry, American actor (born 1857)
December 21 – Lottie Lyell,  Australian director/producer (born 1890)
December 22 – Mary Thurman, American actress (born 1895)
December 24 - James O. Barrows, American stage and screen actor (born 1855)
December 31 – J. Gordon Edwards American director (born 1867)

Film debuts
Walter Brennan – Webs of Steel
Gary Cooper – Dick Turpin
Joan Crawford – Lady of the Night
Stepin Fetchit – The Mysterious Stranger
Phillips Holmes – Her Market Value
Myrna Loy – What Price Beauty?
Tim McCoy – The Thundering Herd
Anita Page – A Kiss for Cinderella
Dolores del Río – Joanna
Gilbert Roland – The Plastic Age

References

Sources
 

 
Film by year